The 2001 NCAA Division I Men's Basketball Championship Game was the finals of the 2001 NCAA Division I men's basketball tournament and it determined the national champion for the 2000-01 NCAA Division I men's basketball season  The 2001 National Title Game was played on April 2, 2001 at the Hubert H. Humphrey Metrodome in Minneapolis, Minnesota, The 2001 National Title Game was played between the 2001 East Regional Champions, #1-seeded Duke and the 2001 Midwest Regional Champions, #2-seeded Arizona.

Participants

Arizona

Featuring future NBA stars Richard Jefferson and Gilbert Arenas along with Wake Forest transfer Loren Woods, future NBA player and coach Luke Walton and future Harlem Globetrotter Eugene "Wildkat" Edgerson, Arizona would enter the 2001 NCAA tournament as the #2 seed in the Midwest Regional. Arizona would crush Eastern Illinois and Butler to reach the Sweet 16. Arizona would beat #3 Ole Miss 66-56 and #1 Illinois to reach the Final Four.

In an emotional season in which coach Lute Olson suffered the loss of his wife Bobbi, he would be just 40 minutes away from a second National Championship after his Wildcats destroyed the defending national champion Michigan State Spartans. The game was close at halftime with Arizona leading by just 2. However, Arizona outscored Michigan State 48–31 in the second half en route to the 19-point victory.

Duke

Featuring Carlos Boozer, Jay Williams and national and Defensive Player of the Year Shane Battier, the Blue Devils would travel the same path they took nine years ago when they claimed their last championship in 1992 and became the first team since UCLA in 1972 and 1973 to repeat as national champions, from Greensboro to Philadelphia to Minneapolis. In their first four games of the tournament, Duke bested Monmouth, Missouri (coached by Duke player and assistant and future NBA coach Quin Snyder) and Los Angeles rivals UCLA and USC all by double digits.

In the Final Four, they met ACC rival Maryland for the fourth time that season after both road teams won during the ACC regular season before Duke won 84–82 in the ACC tournament semifinals in Atlanta en route to winning the tournament. Finding themselves down 39–17 with 6:57 to play in the first half and down 49–38 at the half, Duke went on to stage a comeback against the Terrapins and win 95–84 to advance to the championship game. Duke's 22-point deficit and 11-point halftime deficit marked the largest comeback in Final Four history.

Starting lineups

Game Summary
The second-ranked team coming into the NCAA Tournament would leave giving both the school and coach Mike Krzyzewski their third national championship. Arizona cut Duke's lead to 39-37 early in the second half, but Mike Dunleavy Jr. – with his father, NBA coach Mike Dunleavy Sr. in the stands – connected on three consecutive three-pointers during an 11–2 Duke run. Dunleavy led the Duke Blue Devils with 21 points. The Arizona Wildcats would cut the gap to 3 four times, twice inside the four-minute TV timeout. However, Battier proved himself too much for the Wildcats to handle as he hit two critical shots to put the Blue Devils comfortably ahead. Williams, despite a poor shooting night, iced the game with a three-pointer from the top of the key with under 2 minutes to play to give Duke an 80-72 lead. The final score was Duke 82 - Arizona 72.

References

External links
  from NCAA March Madness

NCAA Division I Men's Basketball Championship Game
NCAA Division I Men's Basketball Championship Games
Arizona Wildcats men's basketball
Duke Blue Devils men's basketball
College basketball tournaments in Minnesota
Basketball competitions in Minneapolis
NCAA Division I Men's Basketball Championship Game
NCAA Division I Men's Basketball Championship Game
2000s in Minneapolis